Jordan Pereira may refer to:

 Jordan Pereira (volleyball) (born 1997), Uruguayan-born Canadian volleyball player
 Jordan Pereira (rugby league) (born 1993), New Zealand rugby league footballer